William J. Boyd (December 22, 1852 – October 1, 1912) was an American Major League Baseball player born in New York, New York. He mainly played third base and right field for three teams during his four-year career in the National Association from  through . He batted .288, hit three home runs, and drove in 91 runs in those four years. While with the 1875 Brooklyn Atlantics, he managed for a period of two games, losing both. When he was not playing in that final season, he filled in for the umpire on 20 occasions.

Boyd died at the age of 59 in Jamaica, New York, and was buried at the Saint John's Cemetery in Middle Village, New York.

References

External links

1852 births
1912 deaths
19th-century baseball players
Major League Baseball third basemen
Major League Baseball right fielders
Baseball player-managers
New York Mutuals players
Brooklyn Atlantics players
Brooklyn Atlantics managers
Hartford Dark Blues players
Baseball players from New York City
Baseball coaches from New York (state)